Dutchland may refer to:

 Pennsylvania Dutch Country, also known as Pennsylvania Dutchland (Pennsylvania Dutch: Deitschland), an area of Pennsylvania, U.S. with Pennsylvania Dutch inhabitants
 Lancaster County, Pennsylvania, home of:
 Dutchland Rollers, or Dutchland Derby Rollers, a women's flat-track roller derby league 
 Greater Netherlands, a hypothetical polity of two Dutch-speaking regions of Flanders and the Netherlands
 "Dutchland", a 2012 song by Sidney Samson

See also

 Holland (disambiguation)
 Netherlands (disambiguation)
 Deutschland (disambiguation)
 Germany
 German language speaking regions
 Germans ethnic regions
 Netherlands, land of the Dutch
 Dutch language speaking regions
 Dutch people ethnic regions
 
 
 Land (disambiguation)
 Dutch (disambiguation)
 Deutsch (disambiguation)